Nakasongola Airport  is an airport in Uganda.  it was one of the 47 airports in the country. It is the intended headquarters of the Air Wing of the Uganda People's Defense Force and, along with Entebbe Airport, Gulu Airport, Jinja Airport and Soroti Airport, is one of the five national military airports.

Location
The geographic coordinates of Nakasongola Airport are:.

Overview
Nakasongola Airport is a medium-sized military airport that serves the town of Nakasongola. It is the largest stand-alone military airport in Uganda.

The airport and the air base on which it is located were constructed by an Israeli company in the 1970s. In 2014, after several years of disuse, the Ugandan government began a renovation of the airport projected to last six months and cost US$11 million (UGX:28 billion), following which the headquarters of the UPDF Air Force were to be relocated to Nakasongola to decongest Entebbe Air Force Base. However, in 2016 the construction of a radar system on the site was still incomplete and threatened by a land-use dispute.  the relocation of the Air Force had reportedly still not occurred.

Helicopter maintenance, repair and overhaul unit
In January 2022, the UPDF Air Force unveiled a helicopter maintenance, repair and overhaul (MRO) unit at the Nakasongola Air Force Base. The installation is a joint venture between National Enterprise Corporation and a Russian company called Pro Heli International Services Limited. The maintenance and repair facility is intended to repair and service Mil Mi-8, Mil Mi-17, Mil Mi-24 and related equipment in the UPDF and regional air forces at a fraction of the cost it takes to ferry the hardware back to Russia for maintenance and repairs.

See also

References

External links
Uganda Moving Combat Aircraft Out of Entebbe

Airports in Uganda
Nakasongola District
Uganda People's Defence Force
Airports established in 1972
1972 establishments in Uganda
Central Region, Uganda